Sirot Island is an island of Papua New Guinea, located in the Green Islands, east of New Ireland. It is located of the north-west coast of Nissan Island, north of Barahun Island.

References

Islands of Papua New Guinea
Geography of the Autonomous Region of Bougainville
Solomon Islands (archipelago)